Strandagaldur, also known as The Museum of Icelandic Sorcery and Witchcraft, is a privately operated and publicly accessible museum dedicated to the folklore and history of sorcery and witchcraft in Iceland. First opened in 2000, and curated by Sigurður Atlason (d. 2018), the museum is located in the coastal town Hólmavík. Based on research which began in 1996, the museum contains various permanent and special exhibitions on subjects such as the Nábrók, or necropants, Icelandic magical staves, Tilberi and Icelandic grimoires. An upstairs area focuses on the history of witch hunts in Iceland, and the genealogy of witches and their accusers. A note invites visitors to consider how they might be related to the historical figures.

Restaurant Galdur 

Restaurant Galdur is the restaurant located within Strandagaldur, offering meatsoup, seafood soup and beef steak as well as a vegetarian and vegan option, plus a variety of beer, coffee and wine.

References

External links

Official website
Official Twitter
Restaurant Galdur on Instagram
Restaurant Galdur on Facebook

Museums in Iceland
Icelandic folklore
Witchcraft museums
Viking Age museums
Buildings and structures in Westfjords